Maj-Britt Nilsson (11 December 1924 – 19 December 2006) was a Swedish film actress of the 1940s and 1950s.

Biography

Nilsson was born in Stockholm, and trained there at the drama school of the Royal Dramatic Theatre. She appeared in three Ingmar Bergman films: Till Glädje (To Joy, 1950), Sommarlek (Summer Interlude or Illicit Interlude, 1951), and Kvinnors Väntan (Secrets of Women or Waiting Women, 1952). She also appeared in the English-language film A Matter of Morals (1961), directed in Sweden by John Cromwell.

Maj-Britt Nilsson died in Cannes, France, aged 82. Her death, which was not widely reported outside Sweden, was confirmed by Jon Asp, executive editor of the online publication Ingmar Bergman Face to Face. No cause was announced.

Personal life 
In 1951, she married Per Gerhard, a theater director and son of Karl Gerhard, a prominent Swedish singer, who survived her by five years.

Filmography
Vårat gäng directed by Gunnar Skoglund (1942)
 The Journey Away by Alf Sjöberg (1945)
 Affairs of a Model by Gustaf Molander (1946)
 Maria by Gösta Folke (1947)
 The Street by Gösta Werner (1949)
The Girl from the Third Row by Hasse Ekman (1949)
Sjösalavår by Per Gunvall (1949)
To Joy by Ingmar Bergman (1950)
Summer Interlude by Ingmar Bergman (1951)
For the Sake of My Intemperate Youth by Arne Mattsson (1952)
Secrets of Women by Ingmar Bergman (1952)
We Three Debutantes by Hasse Ekman (1953)
Wild Birds by Alf Sjöberg (1955)
 A Little Nest by Arne Mattsson (1956)
Egen ingång by Hasse Ekman (1956)
Was die Schwalbe sang by Géza von Bolváry (German film; 1956)
 The Girl in Tails by Arne Mattsson (1956)
 The Jazz Boy by Hasse Ekman (1958)
 The Forests Sing Forever by Paul May (1959)
 The Inheritance of Bjorndal by Gustav Ucicky (Austrian film; 1960)
A Matter of Morals (De sista stegen) by John Cromwell (American-Swedish film; 1961)
Lita på mej, älskling! by Sven Lindberg (1961)
En enkel melodi by Kjell Grede (1974)
Bluff Stop by Jonas Cornell (1977)

References

Further reading

External links

 Maj-Britt Nilsson, Royal Dramatic Training Academy

People from Cannes
Actresses from Stockholm
Swedish expatriates in France
Swedish film actresses
1924 births
2006 deaths